Kuntur Chukuña (Aymara kunturi condor, chukuña to squat, to cower, 'where the condor squats', also spelled Condor Chucuna) is a  mountain in the Bolivian Andes. It is located in the Cochabamba Department, Tapacari Province.

References 

Mountains of Cochabamba Department